Hellinsia phloeochroa is a moth of the family Pterophoridae. It is found in Mexico, Guatemala and Panama.

The wingspan is 23–24 mm. The antennae are pale brownish. The head and thorax are bark-brown, the latter speckled with pale cinereous. The forewings are bark-brown, more or less speckled with pale cinereous. The hindwings and cilia are a little paler than the forewings and rather less reddish brown. Adults are on wing in February, July and August, at an altitude of 500 to 2,000
meters.

References

Moths described in 1915
phloeochroa
Moths of Central America